Weekend is the third studio album of American singer Kenny Lattimore. It was released by Arista Records on October 9, 2001 in the United States. It marked Lattimore's first album with the label, following his transition from Columbia Records.

Biography 

Weekend signified a new direction for Lattimore upon its release in 2001. Rather than progress further into the introspective soul territory of the critically acclaimed previous release From the Soul of Man, Weekend embraced a trendier modern-R&B sound. One reviewer observes, "On Weekend, he delivers an 11-track collection that alternately percolates and simmers, showing the young singer is equally at home whether he's pumping out a party jam or serenading a lover with a passionate ballad."

This new album for a new record label enlisted the help of newer producers like The Characters (Troy Taylor & Charles Farrar), Raphael Saadiq (of Tony! Toni! Tone! fame), and G-funk pioneer Battlecat. Overall, the acoustic guitars, jazz sensibilities, and old soul with which Lattimore was previously associated was replaced with mechanical, stuttering beats, synthesizers, and youthful lyrics.

In a sharp contrast to previous releases, Lattimore sharply scales back his contributions as a songwriter in favor of experimenting with younger talent. Former writing collaborators such as Keith Crouch, Diane Warren, and Barry Eastmond were traded for up-and-coming talent like future hitmaker Johnta Austin, songwriter behind a chart-ubiquitous 2005 pair of songs: Mariah Carey's "We Belong Together" and Mary J. Blige's "Be Without You."

The album showcased its title track as an exuberant, uptempo first single. The bassline of "Weekend" interpolated Blondie's classic "Rapture." Though the single performed well at radio and was well-received across the Atlantic, overall album sales suffered from lack of promotion.

A sonically modern trend dominates the album, but a minority of songs stand in contrast to their counterparts. "Lately" and "Come To Me" are downtempo, bass-heavy, rhythmic tracks with 70's soul influenced arrangements and sensual lyrics. Both could have easily fit a thematic predecessor to From The Soul Of Man. Renowned for his lithe tenor voice, Lattimore slips into a Marvin Gaye-esque falsetto during the latter. Notably, the same timbre anchors Lattimore's cover of "Just to Keep You Satisfied," on the 1999 Marvin Gaye tribute Marvin Is 60. Also, Lattimore has also previously established a convention of closing each album with a gospel song. In this case, "Healing" produced by George Duke provides an organ-driven climactic coda to Weekend.

Critical reception

Billboard critic Chuck Taylor wrote that "with a feelgood rhythm that celebrates everybody's favorite part of the that celebrates everybody's favorite part of the week and slick production by the Characters, "Weekend" may revive the Washington D.C., native's momentum on R&B and  AC stations." AllMusic editor Liana Jonas found that Weekend "with its bland arrangements, cookie-cutter R&B sound, and lyrical vacuity, is a yawn. Hookin' up, the inability to breathe without "the one," and other hackneyed themes abound on this banal album. There isn't enough groove or vibrato, shirt-clutching vocals to keep listeners from growing bored, and fast. Find something else to do this weekend."

Track listing

Samples
 "Weekend" contains replayed elements from "Rapture", performed by Blondie.

Charts

References

External links 
 

2001 albums
Albums produced by Battlecat (producer)
Albums produced by Dre & Vidal
Albums produced by Raphael Saadiq
Albums produced by Troy Taylor (record producer)
Kenny Lattimore albums